Waller is a city in Texas, United States, partly in Waller County and partly in Harris County within the  metropolitan area. Its population was 2,682 at the 2020 U.S. census.

Geography

Waller is located at  (30.058752, –95.926336). Most land development within Waller is located near the historic town center. However, businesses oriented toward travelers are beginning to locate along the U.S. Route 290 corridor.

Climate

The climate in this area is characterized by hot, humid summers and generally mild to cool winters. According to the Köppen climate classification, Waller has a humid subtropical climate, Cfa on climate maps.

Demographics

As of the 2020 United States census, 2,682 people, 1,024 households, and 789 families resided in the city. The 2019 American Community Survey estimated the city had a population of 3,124, up from 2,326 at the 2010 U.S. census, and 2,092 in 2000. The racial and ethnic makeup in 2019 was 49.4% non-Hispanic white, 15.9% Black or African American, 1.6% Asian, 0.2% multiracial, and 32.8% Hispanic and Latin American of any race.

At the census of 2000, 2,092 people, 768 households, and 530 families were residing in the city. The population density was 1,401.1 people per square mile (542.1/km). The 842 housing units averaged 563.9 per square mile (218.2/km). The racial makeup of the city was 66.20% White, 21.70% African American, 0.29% Native American, 0.86% Asian, 9.89% from other races, and 1.05% from two or more races. Hispanics or Latinos of any race were 20.17% of the population.

Of its 768 households,  37.0% had children under  18 living with them, 50.0% were married couples living together, 14.2% had a female householder with no husband present, and 30.9% were not families. About 21.1% of all households were made up of individuals, and 7.9% had someone living alone who was 65 or older. The average household size was 2.72 and the average family size was 3.19.

In the city, the population was distributed as 28.9% under 18, 15.4% from 18 to 24, 28.5% from 25 to 44, 17.7% from 45 to 64, and 9.5% who were 65 or older. The median age was 29 years. For every 100 females, there were 98.1 males. For every 100 females age 18 and over, there were 94.5 males.

The median income for a household in the city was $33,162, and for a family was $42,569. Males had a median income of $30,337 versus $21,250 for females. The per capita income for the city was $14,860. About 14.3% of families and 18.3% of the population were below the poverty line, including 26.9% of those under age 18 and 11.3% of those age 65 or over.

Media
The Waller Times, the only newspaper in Waller, is located at 2323 Main Street.

Government and infrastructure
The current mayor of Waller is Danny L. Marburger; he has actively served for 33 years.

The United States Postal Service Waller Post Office is located at 40090 U.S. Route 290 Business.

Education
Waller is served by the  Waller Independent School District.

Schools serving the city of Waller include:
 Waller High School (unincorporated Harris County)
 Waller Junior High School (Waller)
 Wayne C. Schultz Junior High School (unincorporated Harris County)
 I. T. Holleman Elementary School (Waller)
 Roberts Road Elementary School (Hockley)
 Turlington Elementary School (unincorporated Harris County)
Jones Elementary School
Fields Store Elementary

Transportation
Skydive Houston Airport is located south of Waller in unincorporated Waller County.

Notable people

 A. J. Foyt, auto racing driver
 Daniel Johnston, musician, lived here until his death on September 11, 2019
 Bomani Jones, sports journalist at ESPN
 Amy Adams Strunk, owner of the Tennessee Titans

References

External links
 City of Waller official website
 City of Waller Economic Development Corporation
 Waller Independent School District
 Handbook of Texas Online

Cities in Texas
Cities in Harris County, Texas
Cities in Waller County, Texas
Greater Houston